The Carmen Fantasy, Op. 25, by Pablo de Sarasate is a violin fantasy on themes from the opera Carmen by Georges Bizet. A version with piano accompaniment was published in 1882.

The Carmen Fantasy is one of Sarasate's most well known works and is often performed in violin competitions. It was dedicated to Joseph Hellmesberger.  Because of its delicate techniques and sanguineous passion inspired by the opera, it is considered to be one of the most challenging and technically demanding pieces for the violin.

The piece contains an adaptation of the Aragonaise, Habanera, an interlude, Seguidilla, and the Gypsy Dance. A performance takes approximately 12 minutes.

Movements
The work consists of five movements.

Orchestration
The work is scored for piccolo and 2 flutes, 2 oboes, 2 clarinets, 2 bassoons, 4 horns, 2 trumpets, 3 trombones, timpani, tambourine, harp and strings. There is also an adaptation of the Carmen Fantasy with piano accompaniment.

See also 
 Carmen Fantasie by German-American film composer Franz Waxman

References

External links

Compositions by Pablo de Sarasate
Compositions for violin and orchestra
1882 compositions
Sarasate
Composer tributes (classical music)
Carmen
1880s in Spanish music